Bar zither is class of musical instruments (subset of zither) within the Hornbostel-Sachs classification system for a type of simple chordophone (stringed instrument), in which the body of the instrument is shaped like a bar.

In the system, bar zithers are made up of musical bows and stick zithers. Musical bows have flexible ends, stick zithers are rigid or have only one flexed end. Bar zithers, whether musical bow or stick zithers, often have some form of resonator. Examples of resonators include the player's mouth, an attached gourd or an inflated balloon or bladder.

According to Sachs,

Instruments may be monochords (single stringed) or polychord (multiple stinged).  They may also be idiochords (string made from the bar or stick) or heterchords (string made of separate substance from the bar or stick.

See also
List of chordophones by Hornbostel–Sachs number

References

Musical instruments
Chordophones
Zithers